Brian McGrath (born 1998) is an Irish hurler who plays for Tipperary Senior Championship club Loughmore–Castleiney and at inter-county level with the Tipperary senior hurling team. He usually lines out as a full-back.

Personal life

McGrath is the son of Pat McGrath who won an All-Ireland medal with Tipperary in 1989. His brothers, Noel and John, are also All-Ireland medal-winners and current teammates on the Tipperary senior team.

Career
McGrath made his senior debut for Tipperary on 1 March 2020, in round 4 of the 2020 National Hurling League against Waterford in an 0–24 to 2–16 win.

Career statistics

Club

Hurling

Football

Inter-county

Honours
Loughmore–Castleiney
Tipperary Senior Hurling Championship (1): 2021
Tipperary Senior Football Championship (2): 2016, 2021
Mid Tipperary Senior Hurling Championship (2): 2016, 2018
Mid Tipperary Senior Football Championship (4): 2015, 2016, 2017, 2018

Tipperary
All-Ireland Senior Hurling Championship (1): 2019
All-Ireland Under-21 Hurling Championship (1): 2018
All-Ireland Minor Hurling Championship (1): 2016 (c)
Munster Minor Hurling Championship (2): 2015, 2016 (c)

References

1998 births
Living people
Loughmore-Castleiney hurlers
Loughmore-Castleiney Gaelic footballers
Tipperary inter-county hurlers
Tipperary inter-county Gaelic footballers